The 1982 European Figure Skating Championships was a senior-level international competition held in Lyon, France, from February 2 to 7, 1982. Elite skaters from European ISU member nations competed in the disciplines of men's singles, ladies' singles, pair skating, and ice dancing.

Results

Men

Ladies
Witt was 6th in the compulsory figures and first in the technical program and free skating. Kristofics-Binder won the figures and was third in the technical and the free, with Leistner second in the free.

Pairs
This was the first Europeans in 17 years that was not won by a pair from the Soviet Union. Vorobieva & Lisovsky won the short program over Baess & Thierbach.

Ice dancing

References

External links
 results

European Figure Skating Championships, 1982
European Figure Skating Championships, 1982
European Figure Skating Championships
International figure skating competitions hosted by France
Sports competitions in Lyon
20th century in Lyon
February 1982 sports events in Europe